The Tour Défense 2000 is one of the tallest residential buildings in France. The tower is situated in the La Défense section of Puteaux, a suburb of Paris.

The tower was constructed between April 1971 and November 1974. Its success as a residence was not immediate: two years into its opening only a quarter of its apartments had been sold. In comparison to the other buildings of La Défense, Tour Défense 2000 is relatively isolated, and thus benefits from a beautiful panoramic view.

In total, there are 370 apartments occupying 47 floors, and the building is capable of housing about 700 people. Apartments range in size from 19m² to 140m².

See also 
 Skyscraper
 List of tallest structures in Paris

References

External links 
  Official site

Defense 2000
Defense 2000
Buildings and structures completed in 1974
Apartment buildings in France